Greek South Africans are South Africans of Greek ancestry from Greece and Cyprus. The Greek population in South Africa is estimated to be around 120,000.

Notable people
George Bizos – human rights lawyer who campaigned against apartheid; noted for representing Nelson Mandela during the Rivonia Trial
Demetri Catrakilis – professional rugby union player for Harlequins
Stanley Christodoulou – international boxing judge and referee
Ivan Gazidis – Chief Executive of AC Milan
George Koumantarakis – former football player
Nic Pothas – former professional cricketer
Anastasia Tsichlas – football executive
Dimitri Tsafendas – assassin of South African Prime Minister Hendrik Verwoerd, who is commonly regarded as the architect of apartheid
John Costa (b. 1868 – d. 1932) also known as Ioannis Papakostas was a Greek revolutionary and veteran of the Second Boer War
Xen Balaskas (b. 1910 – d. 1994) - cricketer
Stelio Savante – actor, producer and screenwriter
Penny Siopis – artist
Angelique Rockas – actress and theatre practitioner, pioneer of multi-racial theatre in London
Panagiotis Retsos – footballer
John Kongos – musician
Costa Titch - rapper

See also

Greek diaspora
Greece–South Africa relations
White South Africans

References

Further reading

External links
 Greeks in South Africa on AusGreekNet.com
 Hellenic Community of Cape Town

Greek diaspora in Africa
South Africa
 
Ethnic groups in South Africa
 Greek